Pettitt is an English surname of Hiberno-Norman origin. Variant spellings include Pettit and Petitt. People with the surname include:

B. Montgomery Pettitt, American academic
Dave Pettitt (born 1972), Canadian voice actor
Ellen Pettitt (born 1986), Australian high jumper
Florence Louise Pettitt (1918–2006), American opera conductor
Garth Pettitt (1932—1992), English civil servant
Henry Pettitt (1848–1893), British actor and dramatist
John (Ian) Pettitt (1910–1977), Australian politician
Peggy Pettitt (born 1950), American actress and playwright
Tom Pettitt (1859–1946), American real tennis player

See also
Pettitt v Pettitt, a 1970 leading English trusts law case
Pettit (surname)
Petit (disambiguation)
Andy Pettitte (born 1972), American baseball pitcher

English-language surnames